Tambun Dibty Naibaho (born 14 October 1990, in Pangururan) is an Indonesian professional footballer who played as a forward.

Career

PS TNI
Naibaho makes debut with PS TNI against Madura United FC, Tambun scored goal even though his team did not win. Score of the match ended 1-2 to win Madura United F.C. the second goal when he scored against PSM Makassar in the fifth week at the 2016 Indonesia Soccer Championship A. He was a main player in PS TNI, proved he always played brilliantly.

Semen Padang
In 2017, Naibaho join to Padang club Semen Padang F.C. to competition Liga 1.

PSS Sleman
In 2018, Naibaho join to PSS Sleman. He played 13 times and scored 4 goal, when PSS Sleman played in the second division.

References

External links
 Tambun Naibaho at Liga Indonesia
 Tambun Naibaho at Soccerway

1990 births
Living people
Indonesian footballers
Sportspeople from North Sumatra
Pro Duta FC players
PSMS Medan players
PS TIRA players
Semen Padang F.C. players
Liga 1 (Indonesia) players
Association football forwards
21st-century Indonesian people